Richard Harry Chapura Jr. (born June 15, 1964) is a former American professional football player who was a defensive tackle in the National Football League (NFL) and the World League of American Football (WLAF). He played for the Chicago Bears, Philadelphia Eagles and Phoenix Cardinals of the NFL, and the San Antonio Riders of the WLAF. Chapura played collegiately at the University of Missouri. Currently a Fire Lieutenant for the Englewood Fire Department in Englewood Florida.

References

1964 births
Living people
American football defensive tackles
Chicago Bears players
Missouri Tigers football players
Sportspeople from Sarasota, Florida
Philadelphia Eagles players
Phoenix Cardinals players
Players of American football from Florida
San Antonio Riders players
National Football League replacement players